The Orlando Fighter Wing was a wing of the United States Army Air Forces.  Its last assignment was with the Army Air Forces School of Applied Tactics, stationed at Orlando Army Air Base, Florida  It was inactivated on 1 April 1944.

The wing helped to develop air defense tactics and trained organizations and personnel in air defense techniques. Also served in defense of the Orlando area, using such tactical organizations as were assigned or attached.  Provided defense for the Orlando area but engaged primarily in training fighter and light bombardment organizations and personnel.

Lineage
 Constituted as Air Defense Department, AAF School of Applied Tactics on 27 Nov 1942
 Activated on 3 Dec 1942
 Redesignated Orlando Fighter Wing in Oct 1943
 Disbanded on 1 Apr 1944

Assignments
 Army Air Forces School of Applied Tactics, 3 Dec 1942-1 Apr 1944

Stations
 Orlando Army Air Base, Florida, 3 Dec 1942-1 Apr 1944

References
 Maurer, Maurer (1983). Air Force Combat Units Of World War II. Maxwell AFB, Alabama: Office of Air Force History. .

Fighter wings of the United States Army Air Forces
Military units and formations established in 1942
Military units and formations disestablished in 1944